"More Than a Feeling" is a song by the American rock band Boston, released as the lead single from the band's 1976 debut album by Epic Records in September 1976, with "Smokin' as the B-side. Tom Scholz wrote the whole song. The single peaked at number five on the US Billboard Hot 100. The track is now a staple of classic rock radio, and in 2008, it was named the 39th-best hard rock song of all time by VH1. It was included in the Rock and Roll Hall of Fame list of the "500 Songs That Shaped Rock and Roll" and is ranked number 212 on [[Rolling Stone|Rolling Stone'''s]] "500 Greatest Songs of All Time", updated from its previous position of number 500 on the 2004 version.

Background and writing
"More than a Feeling" took Scholz five years to complete.  Scholz wrote the lyrics based on the idea of losing someone close, and on the way in which music can connect a person to memories of the past.  Though not based on any specific event in Scholz's life, he did take the name Marianne from his cousin.  It is one of six songs (five of which eventually appeared on the Boston album) that he worked on in his basement from 1968 to 1975, before Boston got its record contract.  The drum parts were originally developed by Jim Masdea, although Sib Hashian played the drums on the official release.  The song is written in G major, but published sheet music incorrectly shows the verses in D major. The song is in compound AABA form.

ContentThe Book of Rock Lists suggests that the chorus riff may itself be a subtle homage to the Kingsmen's classic, "Louie Louie." Scholz has stated in multiple interviews his fondness for the James Gang, and in particular that band's 1970s album, James Gang Rides Again. Accordingly, the signature riff for "More than a Feeling" bears a resemblance to that composed by Joe Walsh for the "Rides Again" track "Tend My Garden." Scholz credits "Walk Away Renee" by The Left Banke as the song's main inspiration.

Boston's website says the song is about "the power an old song can have in your life," with Scholz elaborating that "it was sort of a bittersweet ballad."  Ultimate Classic Rock critic Michael Gallucci points out that this is a common theme in Boston songs.

The lyrics express the author's discontent with the present and his yearning for a former love named Marianne, whose memory is strongly evoked by an old familiar song.  In an interview Scholz was asked, "Who is Marianne?"  He replied, "There actually is a Marianne.  She wasn't my girlfriend."  He explained that when he was 8 or 9 years old he had a much older cousin whom he thought was the most beautiful girl he had ever seen and that he was "secretly in love" with her (laughs), but he has also stated that the lyrics were inspired by his emotions after a school love affair ended, and were influenced by the lyrics of the Left Banke song "Walk Away Renee".  Maximum Guitar author Andy Aledort pointed out that the guitar chord progression of G-D/F#-Em7-D that follows the line "I see my Marianne walking away" also comes from "Walk Away Renee."  Aledort also explains that the guitar solo is unusual in that it incorporates mordents and inverted mordents, which are more typically used in baroque music.

ReceptionBillboard described "More Than a Feeling" as an "electric guitar-dominated rocker...made commercial with an accessible beat and hand-clap backup and smooth, soaring vocals."  Cash Box said "it’s a hard-rock offering, but has a sophisticated melody that makes good use of minor chords" and has "attractive" unison guitar work and powerful vocals.  Record World said that with the song Boston "shows it is adept at rocking with a heavy metal fury, yet at the same time builds a dynamic tension around the melody of the tune."  Classic Rock critic Paul Elliott rated it as "Boston's all-time greatest song".  Los Angeles Times critic Robert Hilburn called it a "marvelously appealing pop-rock single" and said that it ranks with Queen's "Bohemian Rhapsody" as one of the best singles of 1976.  Hilburn also said that the song combines "the graceful splendor and rousing melodic hooks of the Moody Blues, the strident guitar impact of Queen's Brian May and some of the romantic pop-rock consciousness of Eric Carmen and the old Raspberries." Guitar World states that when the radio plays "More Than a Feeling", "few can resist indulging in fits of fleet-fingered air guitar and a spirited falsetto sing-along."  Rolling Stone Album Guide critic Paul Evans states that "as slick as it sounds, 'More Than a Feeling' strikes an uncommonly resonant emotional note."  Gallucci rated it Boston's greatest song, as did Classic Rock History critic Brian Kachejian.  Ultimate Classic Rock critic Dave Swanson rated it the number-28 all-time classic rock song.

Personnel
 Tom Scholz – acoustic and electric guitars, bass guitar
 Brad Delp – lead and backing vocals
 Sib Hashian – drums

Covers and use in politics and other media
The song was covered by Yes members Alan White, Tony Kaye and Billy Sherwood in 2007 for the Sherwood-produced all-star album Rock Infinity.

In 1992, when Nirvana performed their breakthrough single, "Smells Like Teen Spirit", at the Reading Festival, they incorporated part of "More Than a Feeling" at the beginning, a reference to the similarities between the two songs' main guitar riffs. This part is included on the DVD version of Nirvana's live album, Live at Reading.

The song was covered by the band Ingram Hill and included on the soundtrack for the 2005 movie Herbie: Fully Loaded.

In 2008 Republican presidential candidate Mike Huckabee used the song to promote his campaign. Former Boston band member Barry Goudreau made appearances with Huckabee both live and on YouTube. In February 2008, Scholz wrote to Huckabee requesting that he stop using the song, stating: "While I'm flattered that you are fond of my song, I'm shocked that you would use it and the name Boston to promote yourself without my consent. Your campaign's use of 'More Than a Feeling', coupled with the representation of one of your supporters as a member 'of Boston' clearly implies that the band Boston, and specifically one of its members, has endorsed your candidacy, neither of which is true." Huckabee complied with Scholz's request, and videos featuring Barry Goudreau and the song were subsequently removed by the Huckabee campaign.

Downloadable content for music games
The song was covered by WaveGroup Sound as part of the soundtrack for the original Guitar Hero released in 2005, and later released as a master recording on Guitar Hero Smash Hits and Guitar Hero Lives GHTV.

The song was made available to download on March 1, 2011, for use in the Rock Band music video game series.

The song is also available as downloadable content (DLC) for the Rocksmith'' guitar learning game. The song is available individually or as part of the 'Rock Hits 70s' Song Pack along with "Jessica" by The Allman Brothers Band and Deep Purple's "Smoke on the Water."

Charts

Weekly charts

Year-end charts

Certifications

References

External links
 

1976 debut singles
Boston (band) songs
Hard rock ballads
1970s ballads
Songs written by Tom Scholz
Song recordings produced by Tom Scholz
Song recordings produced by John Boylan (record producer)
Epic Records singles
Songs about music
Hit the Lights songs
1976 songs